Spring Garden is a subway station on SEPTA's Broad Street subway in Philadelphia, Pennsylvania.  It is an express station with four tracks and two island platforms.  Spring Garden is the northernmost station in Center City, serving Community College of Philadelphia, the School District of Philadelphia Building, the Inquirer Building (former home of Philadelphia newspapers The Philadelphia Inquirer and Philadelphia Daily News), Ben Franklin High School and miscellaneous office buildings, restaurants, and clubs.  The Philadelphia Museum of Art is ten blocks west of the station, while the Northern Liberties neighborhood lies approximately eight blocks east. Near this station is Masterman Laboratory & Demonstration School. There are numerous restaurants and shops nearby which makes this a very busy station.

Spring Garden station is the seventh busiest station on the Broad Street Line, with 10,000 riders a day.

Station layout

Gallery

References

External links

 Spring Garden Street entrance from Google Maps Street View

SEPTA Broad Street Line stations
Railway stations in Philadelphia
Railway stations in the United States opened in 1928
Railway stations located underground in Pennsylvania